Jack Gargan may refer to:

 Jack Gargan (politician) (1930–2018), chairman of the Reform Party and candidate for the United States House of Representatives
 Jack Gargan (hurler) (1918–1991), Irish hurler

See also
John Gargan (disambiguation)